Sayee and Subbulakshmi, popularly known as Sayee–Subbulakshmi, were two Indian female Bharatanatyam dancers who performed on stage in South Indian and Hindi films. They were a twin dance duo and were popular during the 1950s and 60s. They were noted for their synchronised dancing.  They also performed Kathak and folk style dances in some regional language films and Hindi films.

Family
They hail from a very large family whose members are well connected to the film industry. They are the descendants of Panrutti Adilakshmi, mother of Carnatic singers P. A.  Rajamani and P. A. Periyanayaki, who were popularly known as the Madras Sisters (Not to be confused with the Madras Sisters (Sashi, Kala, and Mala). They had also featured in Tamil films in various roles. P. A. Periyanayaki was also known as a playback singer. Lux soap beauty R. Padma, who featured in the 1941 comedy film Sabapathy is the mother-in-law of Sayee.
Sayee is the daughter of P.A.Rajamani and Subbulakshmi is P.A.Rajamani's maternal first cousin.

(Note: Sayee is said to be the daughter of P. A. Rajamani and Subbulakshmi, who is 3 years older to Sayee, is her cousin. This could not be confirmed. However, both of them are closely related and belong to the same extended family.)

Dance training

Muthuswamy Pillai is a dance teacher who has choreographed dances for films since 1938. P. A. Periyanayaki approached Muthuswami Pillai when he was choreographing a dance for B. S. Saroja in the film Inbavalli at Salem Ratna Studios. She requested him to train her niece Sayee and her cousin Subbulakshmi in dancing.  Muthuswami Pillai accepted. He stayed with the family so that he could give exclusive training to the two. Sayee was about 5 years old at that time and Subbulakshmi was 3 years older. He made both  watch dance performances by Kumari Kamala.

The two girls had a rigorous training - 3 hours in the morning and another 3 or 4 hours in the evening. Muthusami Pillai trained them for 7 years in between his film assignments. He took classes whenever he was in town.

Sayee and Subbulakshmi were trained in Kathak dance by Gopi Krishna, who was a dancer and the choreographer for the famed Hindi film Jhanak Jhanak Payal Baaje.

Arangetram and Introduction to films
Sayee and Subbulakshmi had their Arangetram on 14 September 1953 at R. R. Sabha Hall in Chennai presided over by Rajah Sir M. A. Muthaiah Chettiar.

Within a year they had their first performance in the 1954 film Malaikkallan. The film was produced in 6 languages that opened opportunities far and wide for this dancing duo.

Apart from dancing, they have also featured in minor roles in some of the films they danced in.

Since 1954, they have performed in many South Indian regional films and Hindi films.

Bharatanatyam performances
They held stage performances as well. When Sivaji Ganesan built a new house Annai Illam at Thiyagaraya Nagar in Chennai, the Bharatanatyam performance by Sayee and Subbulakshmi was the main item during reception.

Style of dancing

The duo were felicitated by N. S. Krishnan as Pambara Sahodarigal (Spinning top sisters).  The speed, precision, flexibility, springing leg movements coupled with the synchronisation made them a unique pair.

Dance Teacher
After the 1960s, the trend in Indian films underwent a radical change and the type of dances performed by this duo went unnoticed. Subbulakshmi taught Bharatanatyam to students. She was felicitated with the Kalaimamani award in 2000 for her services as a teacher.

Personal life
Sayee was married to V. S. Santaram, eldest son of Lux beauty R. Padma. They have a son. Sayee suffered from breast cancer and died on 26 January 2010.

Filmography

References

Bibliography

External links
 - Their First film dance in Malaikkallan. Bharatanatyam based.
 - From the film Bharosa. Kathak based.

Indian female classical dancers
Indian film choreographers
Indian women choreographers
Indian choreographers
Performers of Indian classical dance
Entertainer duos
Indian women playback singers
Women artists from Tamil Nadu
20th-century Indian women singers
20th-century Indian dancers
Actresses in Tamil cinema
Actresses in Telugu cinema
Actresses in Hindi cinema
20th-century Indian actresses
Indian film actresses
Bharatanatyam exponents
20th-century Indian singers
20th-century Indian women artists
Dancers from Tamil Nadu